Lantfred of Fleury, also known as Lantfred of Winchester, was a 10th and 11th century Anglo-Saxon monk who lived in Winchester, Hampshire, England. He was originally from the French town of Fleury-sur-Loire. Lantfred is famous for having written Vita S. Swithuni ("The Life of St. Swithun") and Translatio et miracula S. Swithuni ("The Translation and Miracles of St. Swithun"), the oldest known account of St. Swithun's life, as well as Vita S. Birini ("The Life of St. Birinus").

References

External links
 

Anglo-Saxon writers
11th-century English writers
Christian hagiographers
English Christian monks
10th-century English writers
10th-century Christian monks
11th-century Christian monks
10th-century Latin writers
11th-century Latin writers